The Blaze are the French Paris-based music and video duo Guillaume and Jonathan Alric. The duo are cousins and produce ambient EDM.

Musical career
Guillaume Alric and Jonathan Alric began making music together when Jonathan, who was at film school in Brussels, asked Guillaume to work with him on a music video soundtrack.

As a duo they took the name The Blaze. They have explained that in addition to the strength and warmth suggested by the name, it means "name" in French slang.

Their distinctive integrative method involves producing sound and visuals at the same time, creating an especially strong link between music and image.

In January 2016 they released their debut video, "Virile," on Brodinski's Bromance Records. It won the UK Music Video Award (UKMVA) for Best Alternative Video - International in 2016.

On 7 April 2017 they released their debut EP, Territory, on the new Animal 63 label (headed by management and publishing company Savoir Faire and Believe Digital). The EP's six tracks included "Virile" and "Territory." Their "Territory" music video, released in February 2017, produced and directed by themselves, won the Film Craft Grand Prix at the 2017 Cannes Lions International Festival of Creativity, Best Director at the Berlin Music Video Awards and the Best International Dance Video UK MVA.

"Heaven," their third video, was released in February 2018. It captures an idyllic outdoor scene amid a community of family and friends. "Heaven" was the final instalment of the video triptych.

Their 2018 touring schedule included European and US festivals including Coachella, Primavera Sound, the Roskilde Festival, Lollapalooza, Pitchfork Paris, Parklife, Lovebox, and Reading and Leeds Festivals.

Their debut full-length album Dancehall was released in September 2018. Its 10 tracks include the single "Heaven," along with the singles "She" and "Faces" which were released in summer 2018.

Discography

Studio Albums
 Dancehall (Animal 63/Columbia/RCA, 2018)
 Jungle (Animal 63/Columbia Records/RCA Records, 2023)

EPs
 Territory (Animal 63/Columbia/RCA, 2017)

Singles

External Links
Berlin Music Video Awards 2014, Best Photography with Holidays

References

2016 establishments in France
Electronic dance music duos
French house music groups
Musical groups established in 2016